Kilmacud Crokes won the 2005 Dublin Senior Football Championship against Ballyboden St Endas. Kilmacud won by 1-11 to 2-02 against Ballyboden.

External links
 Official Dublin Website
 Dublin on Hoganstand
 Dublin Club GAA
 Reservoir Dubs
 Dublin Teams

Dublin Senior Football Championship
Dublin Senior Football Championship